The Hyosung Comet Series comprises a range of 125, 250, and 650 cc V-Twin engined recreational motorcycles. They are made in South Korea by Hyosung Motors & Machinery Inc.  All models in the Comet series are designated by model codes in the form GTxxxs with xxx representing the approximate engine displacement in cubic centimetres, and R or S being optional suffixes designating the motorcycle style (full fairing and half fairing respectively, being the default a naked bike).

Current Models
The Comet series range currently includes the models listed below.

GT125
GT250R, GT250
GT650R, GT650S, GT650

External links
https://web.archive.org/web/20071011022710/http://www.hyosungmotorsusa.com/product/roadsport/main.asp?product=RoadSports

Comet series